The Gogomain River is a  stream in the Upper Peninsula of Michigan in the United States. It is located in Raber Township in Chippewa County and flows into Munuscong Lake, part of the St. Marys River waterway and an arm of Lake Huron.

See also
List of rivers of Michigan

References

Michigan  Streamflow Data from the USGS

Rivers of Michigan
Rivers of Chippewa County, Michigan
Tributaries of Lake Huron